Goodwill Records is a record label that was founded in Rome in 1994, primarily to release records by This Side Up, a melodic hardcore punk band in which two of the label's founders played. The label eventually absorbed the Bored Teenagers mailorder business that had been run by one of the founders, Dario Adamic, since 1990. 

The label has worked with bands such as Liars Academy, At Half-Mast, The Headlines, Signs Of Hope, Pointing Finger, To The Embers, No More Fear, and Values Intact. This Side Up's third release, a split 7-inch album with Brazilian band White Frogs, sold 3,600 units and is to date the label's best selling record.

Artists

References

External links
Official site
MySpace page

Radio Riot interview
Il Giardino Di Babele
DeadFormat

Italian record labels